Muirgius mac Tadhg More was the eighth king of Moylurg, who reigned from 1159 to 1187, and was brother of the previous king. The Annals of the Four Masters record his death in the latter year with the comment: "Mac Dermot (Maurice, son of Teige), Lord of Moylurg, died in his own mansion on Claenlough, in Clann-Chuain."

References
 "Mac Dermot of Moylurg: The Story of a Connacht Family", Dermot Mac Dermot, 1996.
 http://www.macdermot.com/

1187 deaths
12th-century Irish monarchs
People from County Roscommon
MacDermot family
Year of birth unknown